KMPO (88.7 FM) is a radio station broadcasting a Spanish-language public radio format. It serves the Modesto area of the northern San Joaquin Valley. The station is licensed to Modesto, in Stanislaus County, California and is owned by Radio Bilingüe, Inc.

See also
List of community radio stations in the United States

External links

MPO
MPO
Modesto, California
Mass media in Stanislaus County, California
Radio stations established in 1984
1984 establishments in California
Community radio stations in the United States